Eva in Silk (German: Eva in Seide) is a 1928 German silent film directed by Carl Boese and starring Lissy Arna, Walter Rilla and Margarete Kupfer. It was shot at the National Studios in Berlin. The film's sets were designed by the art director Karl Machus.

Cast
 Lissy Arna as Helene Hain  
 Walter Rilla as Dr. Erich Stiereß, Schriftsteller  
 Margarete Kupfer as Frau Hapke, Zimmervermieterin  
 Max Maximilian as Choko-Karl, Zeitungshändler  
 Carl Walther Meyer as Alfred  
 Gerhard Dammann as Max Bing, Pelzhändler  
 Kurt Vespermann as Fritz Jacobsthal, Manager  
 Leopold von Ledebur as Generaldirektor Dürr  
 Charles Francois as Empfangschef Hotel Adlon  
 Alexander Murski as Sir James Reed 
 Alfred Graening as Mr. Dewey, englischer Großindustrieller  
 Olga Limburg as Mlle. Lossange  
 Ekkehard Arendt as Se.Durchlaucht Prinz Rudolf Rüdiger Ottersburg

References

Bibliography
 James Robert Parish & Kingsley Canham. Film Directors Guide: Western Europe. Scarecrow Press, 1976.

External links

1928 films
Films of the Weimar Republic
Films directed by Carl Boese
German silent feature films
National Film films
German black-and-white films
Films based on Austrian novels